State Road 688 (SR 688) is an east–west route in Pinellas County running from Indian Rocks Beach to northeastern St. Petersburg, Florida, where it merges onto Interstate 275 (I-275).

Route description

The highway changes its name as it heads east across Pinellas County. From Gulf Boulevard in Indian Rocks Beach, it runs along 5th Avenue and crosses the bridge over the Intracoastal Waterway as the Indian Rocks Causeway. Once off the causeway, it becomes Walsingham Road and runs on to the intersection of Walsingham and Ulmerton Roads. Walsingham continues east, but State Road 688 loops north and then east on Ulmerton Road. It skirts Largo before crossing U.S. Route 19 (US 19) and then merges briefly with Roosevelt Boulevard (SR 686). It continues into northeast St. Petersburg and its traffic merges with I-275.

History
Ulmerton Road was named for the community of Ulmers, which arose around Marion Ulmer's turpentine still, timber and naval stores interests in the first half of the twentieth century. In the 1950s, the area was very rural, and cattle were driven along the then dirt road.  Today it carries traffic across the middle of the most densely populated county in Florida.

Major intersections

References

Further reading

Largo Area Historical Society. From Pines and Palmettos—A portrait of Largo. The Donning Company Publishers. Virginia Beach, Va. 2005. 
Largo Bicentennial Book Committee. Largo, then till . . . . Largo Area Historical Society. 1979.
Pinellas County Staff. Pinellas County GIS Viewer.  Online January 12, 2006.

688
688